Hurricane Alley is an area of warm water in the Atlantic Ocean stretching from the west coast of northern Africa to the east coast of Central America and Gulf Coast of the Southern United States. Many hurricanes form within this area.  The sea surface temperature of the Atlantic in Hurricane Alley has grown slightly warmer over the past decades. A particularly warm summer in 2005 led climate scientists to begin studying whether this trend would lead to an increase in hurricane activity.

How hurricanes form

Hurricanes form over tropical waters in areas of high humidity, light winds, and warm sea surface temperatures. These areas are usually between the latitudes of 8° and 20° north. The perfect temperature for a hurricane is approximately 26 °C. This temperature has been set as a standard. If the water is colder the hurricane will most likely weaken, but if the waters are warmer rapid growth can occur.

The area between 10° and 20°N create the most hurricanes in a given season because of the warmer temperatures. Hurricanes do not form outside this range because the Coriolis effect is not strong enough to create the tight circulation needed and above this range the temperatures are too cool. The waters are only at the necessary temperatures from July until mid-October. In the Atlantic this is the height of the season.

Since hurricanes rely on sea surface temperature, sometimes an initially active season becomes quiet later. This is because the hurricanes are so strong that they churn the waters and bring colder waters up from the deep. This creates an area of the sea the size of the hurricane, which has cooler waters, which can be 5–10 °C lower than before the hurricane. When a new hurricane moves over the cooler waters they have no fuel to continue to thrive, so they weaken or even die out.

Historical trends 
According to an Azores High hypothesis of geographer Kam-biu Liu, an anti-phase pattern is expected to exist between the Gulf of Mexico coast and the North American Atlantic coast. During the quiescent periods (3000–1400 BC, and 1000 AD to present), a more northeasterly position of the Azores High would result in more hurricanes being steered towards the Atlantic coast. During the hyperactive period (1400 BC to 1000 AD), more hurricanes were steered towards the Gulf coast as the Azores High was shifted to a more southwesterly position near the Caribbean. Such a displacement of the Azores High is consistent with paleoclimatic evidence that shows an abrupt onset of a drier climate in Haiti around 3200 years BP, and a change towards more humid conditions in the Great Plains during the late-Holocene as more moisture was pumped up the Mississippi Valley through the Gulf coast. Preliminary data from the northern Atlantic coast seem to support the Azores High hypothesis. A 3,000-year proxy record from a coastal lake in Cape Cod suggests that hurricane activity has increased significantly during the past 500–1,000 years, just as the Gulf coast was amid a quiescent period of the last millennium.

See also

 Bermuda Triangle
 Hailstorm Alley
 Typhoon Alley

References

Further reading
http://www.nhc.noaa.gov/climo/
*http://earthobservatory.nasa.gov/Features/DelicateBalance/balance.php NASA.gov
NASA.gov

Tropical meteorology
Atlantic hurricanes